The Greek community in Belgium numbers around 25,000 to 35,000 people.

History
Although Greeks were already living in Belgium before 1956, most migration from Greece to Belgium happened between 1956 and 1964. An estimated 20,000 Greeks were then attracted as guest workers for the mining industry. They ended up mainly in the city of Mons or the mining region in the province of Limburg. Gradually, they also migrated to Brussels, where, among other things, a Greek community settled around Brussels-North railway station.

Since the Financial crisis of 2007–2008, which hit Greece hard on the socio-economic front, an increasing number of Greeks started migrating for work to Belgium.

Notable people

 Iosif Poursanidis Composer-musician, Founder of the Hellenic Community Turnhout-Kempen
 :fr:Jean Daskalidès, chocolatier
 :fr:Christos Doulkeridis, politician
 Leonidas Kestekides, chocolatier, founder of the Brussels-based Leonidas chocolate company
 Viktor Klonaridis, football player
 Charly Konstantinidis, football player
 Thivaios brothers, DJ-s
 Katerine Avgoustakis, singer
 Daphne Patakia , actress

See also
 Belgium–Greece relations
 Greek diaspora
 Greek people

References

External links
 eokb.eu- Hellenic Federation of Communities in Belgium
  Bilateral relations between Greece and Belgium
 Greek Orthodox Church in Belgium
  Greek embassy in Brussels

Belgium
 
Ethnic groups in Belgium